The 2014 New Zealand Open Grand Prix officially SkyCity New Zealand Open 2014 was a badminton tournament which took place at the North Shore Events Centre, Auckland, New Zealand from 15 until 19 April 2014 and had a total purse of $50,000.

Tournament
The 2014 New Zealand Open Grand Prix was the fifth grand prix badminton tournament of the 2014 BWF Grand Prix Gold and Grand Prix and also part of the New Zealand Open championships which has been held since 1927 in Whanganui. This tournament organised by the Match Point Event Ltd., with the sanctioned from the BWF. There are 240 players from 16 countries competed at this tournament. Players chased world ranking points, to qualifying for the Glasgow Commonwealth Games and World Championships. The tournament consisted of both men's and women's singles and doubles draws as well as a mixed doubles event.

Venue
This international tournament held at the North Shore Events Centre, Silverfield Lane, Wairau Valley,
North Shore, Auckland.

Point distribution
Below is the tables with the point distribution for each phase of the tournament based on the BWF points system for the Grand Prix event.

Prize money
The total prize money for this year tournament is US$50,000. Distribution of prize money will be in accordance with BWF regulations.

Men's singles
A former world No.1 and also London Olympics semifinalist Lee Hyun-il competed in this event as an unseeded player. He reach the third round after retired from the match to Tan Chun Seang with the score 21–14, 2–1. The top seed, Hsu Jen-hao reach the final match but was defeated by his compatriot Wang Tzu-wei who was seeded 4 with the straight games 21–9, 21–13.

Seeds

  Hsu Jen-hao (finals)
  Sourabh Varma (third round)
  Tan Chun Seang (quarterfinals)
  Zulfadli Zulkiffli (champion)
  Arvind Bhat (semifinals)
  Wang Tzu-wei (champion)
  Wan Chia-hsin (quarterfinals)
  Joe Wu (third round)
 Mohamad Arif Abdul Latif (semifinals)
 Riyanto Subagja (third round)
 Lin Yu-hsien (third round)
 Dharma Alrie Guna (first round)
 Yogendran Khrishnan (first round)
 Shih Kuei-chun (quarterfinals)
 Michael Fowke (first round)
 Jiann Shiarng Chiang (quarterfinals)

Finals

Women's singles
The top seed in this event were Pai Hsiao-ma, Cheng Chi-ya of Chinese Taipei, Millicent Wiranto of Indonesia, and Michelle Chan Ky of New Zealand. The host representation Chan ended earlier in the second round. The top seed Pai fell in the quarter finals. She was defeated by Nozomi Okuhara of Japan. In their previous 2 meetings, Okuhara has always been the unseeded while Pai always had a seed rank, however, Okuhara has reigned supreme both times. At the end of the women's singles event, Okuhara clinched the title and also making this victory as her first senior international title.

Seeds

  Pai Hsiao-ma (quarterfinals)
  Cheng Chi-ya (semifinals)
  Millicent Wiranto (quarterfinals)
  Michelle Chan Ky (second round)

Finals

Men's doubles
A former men's doubles No.1 Koo Kien Keat compete at this event as the fifth seed partnered with Pakkawat Vilailak. The top seed pair Liang Jui-wei and Liao Kuan-hao fell in the quarterfinals, they were defeated by the 2012 World Junior Championships Takuto Inoue and Yuki Kaneko of Japan.  The men's doubles title goes to Indonesian pair Kevin Sanjaya Sukamuljo and Selvanus Geh. The pair upsetting the number 2 seeded Chinese Taipei pairing Chen Hung-ling and Lu Chia-pin in a fierce 3 game battle.

Seeds

 Liang Jui-wei / Liao Kuan-hao (quarterfinals)
 Chen Hung-ling / Lu Chia-pin (finals)
 Gan Teik Chai / Ong Soon Hock (first round)
 Raymond Tam / Glenn Warfe (second round)
 Koo Kien Keat /  Pakkawat Vilailak (second round)
 Robin Middleton / Ross Smith (quarterfinals)
 Kevin Dennerly-Minturn / Oliver Leydon-Davis (second round)
 Hardianto / Agripinna Prima Rahmanto Putra (semifinals)

Finals

Women's doubles
The New Zealand third seeds Anna Rankin and Madeleine Stapleton were upset in the second round, losing to Chen Szu-yu and Cheng Chi-ya of Chinese Taipei in straight games. The top seed from Malaysia Ng Hui Ern and Ng Hui Lin were fall in the quarter finals, they were lost to Japanese pair Yuki Fukushima and Sayaka Hirota in the rubber game. The fourth seeded from Australia won the women's doubles title after beat Shizuka Matsuo and Mami Naito in thrilling three game final.

Seeds

 Ng Hui Ern / Ng Hui Lin (quarterfinals)
 Jacqueline Guan / Gronya Somerville (quarterfinals)
 Anna Rankin / Madeleine Stapleton (second round)
 He Tian Tang / Renuga Veeran (champion)

Finals

Mixed doubles
The top seeded Oliver and Susannah Leydon-Davis were defeated in the second round by the former world No.1 Koo Kien Keat who was partnered with Ng Hui Lin. The final match presented by all Indonesian pair. Alfian Eko Prasetya and Annisa Saufika emerged victorious in three close games over Edi Subaktiar and Melati Daeva Oktaviani, in a match with long rallies, great net play and plenty of power.

Seeds

 Oliver Leydon-Davis / Susannah Leydon-Davis (second round)
 Ross Smith / Renuga Veeran (second round)
 Raymond Tam / Gronya Somerville (first round)
 Matthew Chau / Jacqueline Guan (quarterfinals)
 Irfan Fadhilah / Gloria Emanuelle Widjaja (semifinals)
 Ronald Alexander / Weni Anggraini (withdrew)
 Takuto Inoue / Yuki Fukushima (second round)
 Muhammad Adib Haiqal Nurizwan / Sannatasah Saniru (first round)

Finals

References

External links
 Official site
 Tournament draw at tournamentsoftware.com

New Zealand Open (badminton)
BWF Grand Prix Gold and Grand Prix
New Zealand Open Grand Prix
New Zealand Open Grand Prix
Sport in Auckland
April 2014 sports events in New Zealand